"Créeme" (Spanish for "Believe Me") is a song by Colombian singers-songwriters Karol G and Maluma. It was written by Karol G, Maluma, Filly Andrés, Juan Vargas, Lenin Yorney, Rene Cano and Kevyn Ceuz and produced by the latter two, Lexuz and Shakal. The song was released on November 1, 2018 through Universal Music Latino, as the fourth single from her second studio album Ocean.

Background 
The song was announced on October 26, 2018 through Karol G's social media accounts with the title and release date. A snippet of the song was shared on the following days. The song was released on November 1, 2018.

Commercial performance 
"Créeme" debuted at number 22 on the US Billboard Hot Latin Songs chart dated November 17, 2018. On its sixteenth week, the song reached its final peak of number 11 on the chart dated March 2, 2019.

Awards and nominations

Music video 
The music video for "Créeme" was directed by Jessy Terreno and was released on Karol G's YouTube channel on November 1, 2018. As of January 2023, it has over 620 million views.

Charts

Weekly charts

Year-end charts

Certifications

References 

2018 songs
2018 singles
Karol G songs
Spanish-language songs